Scream of the Iron Iconoclast is the fifth studio album by the Philadelphia band Stinking Lizaveta.

Track listing

 "Gravitas" - 2:43  
 "Scream of the Iron Iconoclast" - 3:40  
 "To the Sun" - 4:27  
 "Secrets of the Past" - 5:07  
 "Willie Nelson (Tired of the War)" - 4:36  
 "Unreal" - 6:03  
 "Yagan's Head" - 2:08  
 "Thirteenth Moon" - 3:35  
 "Soul Retrieval" - 4:37  
 "Indomitable Wall" - 2:31  
 "Presence of Mind" - 3:44  
 "Requiem for a Rock Band" - 4:59  
 "That's How I Feel" - 3:38  
 "Cyclops" - 3:34  
 "The Neutral Ground" - 3:57  
 "Nails" - 1:41

External links
Scream of the Iron Iconoclast by Stinking Lizaveta @ Encyclopaedia Metallum

2007 albums
albums produced by Steve Albini